Thomas Wagner may refer to:

 Tom Wagner, State Auditor of Delaware
 Thomas Wagner (designer)) (born 1977), German video game designer
 Thomas Wagner (footballer) (born 1976), Austrian football striker
 Thomas Wagner (writer), American television writer and producer
 Thomas M. Wagner (c. 1824–1862), Confederate Army officer

See also
 Thomas Wagoner (born 1942), American politician and businessman